The 2016–17 season was S.P.A.L.'s first season back in second division of the Italian football league, the Serie B, and the 110th as a football club.

Players

First-team quad

Pre-season and friendlies

Competitions

Overall record

Serie A

League table

Results summary

Results by round

Matches
The league fixtures were announced on 3 August 2016.

Coppa Italia

References

S.P.A.L. seasons
SPAL